The 2005 Norwegian Figure Skating Championships was held in Hamar from January 14 to 16, 2005. Skaters competed in the discipline of single skating. The results were used to choose the teams to the 2005 World Championships, the 2005 European Championships, the 2005 Nordic Championships, and the 2005 World Junior Championships.

Senior results

Ladies

External links
 
 results 

Norwegian Figure Skating Championships
Norwegian Figure Skating Championships, 2005
2005 in Norwegian sport